Gerald William Hart (born January 1, 1948) is a Canadian former professional ice hockey player who played 730 games in the National Hockey League (NHL) with the Detroit Red Wings, New York Islanders, Quebec Nordiques, and St. Louis Blues between 1969 and 1982. He reached the NHL playoff semifinals four times in five seasons with the Islanders.

Hart retired from the NHL in 1982 and began living off his investments.

In October 1992, Hart, along with college roommates Thomas Mattioli and Randolph Nash, opened The Rinx recreation complex in Hidden Pond Park in Hauppauge, New York with a 20-year land lease from the Town of Islip. On May 26, 2004, Hart sold the popular ice rink and day camp to Francis J. Palamara, a business consultant, who formerly served as Executive Vice President for Aramark.

Career statistics

Regular season and playoffs

Awards and achievements
 MJHL First All-Star Team (1967)
 Turnbull Cup MJHL Championship (1967)
 WCJHL First All-Star Team (1968)
 Honoured Member of the Manitoba Hockey Hall of Fame
 Suffolk Sports Hall of Fame on Long Island in the Hockey Category with the Class of 1997.

External links
 
 Hart's biography at Manitoba Hockey Hall of Fame

1948 births
Living people
Baltimore Clippers players
Canadian ice hockey defencemen
Detroit Red Wings players
Flin Flon Bombers players
Ice hockey people from Manitoba
New York Islanders players
Nova Scotia Voyageurs players
Quebec Nordiques players
Sportspeople from Flin Flon
St. Louis Blues players
Tidewater Wings players